Warren Long (born 16 April 1956) is a Canadian gymnast. He competed in eight events at the 1984 Summer Olympics.

References

External links
 

1956 births
Living people
Canadian male artistic gymnasts
Olympic gymnasts of Canada
Gymnasts at the 1984 Summer Olympics
Sportspeople from Victoria, British Columbia
Pan American Games medalists in gymnastics
Pan American Games silver medalists for Canada
Pan American Games bronze medalists for Canada
Gymnasts at the 1979 Pan American Games
Medalists at the 1979 Pan American Games
20th-century Canadian people
21st-century Canadian people